Trapeze Software Inc. is an operating company of Volaris Group which is an operating group of Constellation Software that is engaged in the development, installation and customization of intelligent transportation systems. Its product offerings include scheduling, route optimization, staffing asset management, and communication systems. The division is headquartered in Mississauga, Ontario, and has offices across Canada and the United States, with operating subsidiaries across North America, Northern Europe, Australia and the United Kingdom

History

Origins 
Constellation Software Inc. is a provider of software and services to public and private sector markets. The Company operates in two business segments: the public sector segment, which includes businesses focusing upon government and government-related customers, and the private sector segment, which includes businesses focusing upon commercial customers. Founded in 1995, Constellation has 13,000 employees spread over 6 operating segments.

Acquisitions 

 2013    Acquired Mentor Engineering Inc.
 2011    Created Cultura Technologies, bringing together the acquired Agri-Food software businesses
 2010    Acquired BMS Computer Solutions Ltd, a provider of software to the Agriculture industry
 2010    Acquired AGRIS and ExtendAg product suites from John Deere Agri Services, Inc., a division of Deere & Company
 2008    Acquired Assets and Liabilities from MAXIMUS
 2008    Acquired Cal Software, including Kinross Software
 2008    Acquired Southern Computer Systems a privately held company providing fleet management software to Local Authorities, bus companies and coach operators throughout the UK
 2008    Acquired Solutions by Computer which provides business management software to the equipment, tool, and event rental industry
 2007	Acquired the Fleet Runner solution suite from Data Futures
 2007	Acquired Grampian Software Holdings Ltd in the UK adding Duty Allocation and Distillery Records and Management products to the Trapeze portfolio
 2006	Acquired Action Information Management (AIM) an established leader in RTPI, ITS and PTI  
 2006	Acquired assets of Inovas and its product lines including VRT, EcoRoute Trainer (ert), Aerial Asset Survey, Pipe Inspect and Fusion
 2005	Acquired AUSTRICS software and intellectual property from TransAdelaide, a public transport provider based in Australia
 2005	Acquired Education Planning Solutions, a provider of planning software for school districts
 2004	Created Trapeze ITS, a new division providing intelligent transportation systems
 2004	Acquired Public Transport Sector division of Anite, based in the United Kingdom
 2002	Acquired ATIS division of ManTech
 2002	Acquired Multisystems Information Technology Group, a division of Multisystems, Inc.
 2001	Acquired Cerney Computer Services (UK), a provider of demand response software for community transport
 2000	Acquired Traffic Partners, Denmark, a European software provider for transport planning, operations, management 
 1998	Acquired Ecotran Corp, entered school transit market
 1996	Merged with Online Data Products, Scottsdale AZ, a company focusing on paratransit software

Technology

Platform 

Trapeze's point systems and enterprise started on the DOS platform and later moved over to the Windows platform. Trapeze has since created applications that can be accessed over the web.

Databases 

Trapeze's applications leverage MS-SQL and Oracle database infrastructures to operate.

Product and services offering 

Trapeze provides applications for the following areas of people transport.

Paratransit (Demand Response Transport) Scheduling System 

Trapeze PASS is a scheduling and dispatching application developed to support the transportation management efforts of demand response transit services while following guidelines from the Americans with Disabilities Act. PASS can be used for client registration, trip booking, real-time scheduling, and dispatching. 
PASS integrates GIS mapping, enabling users to precisely geocode client addresses and destinations, calculate trip lengths and distances for accurate scheduling, and zoom in to view detailed information about the service area. 
The PASS system can be extended to include other modules for demand response management, such as coordinated transportation; eligibility certification, customer communication management; real-time vehicle location and mobile data communication; and Web and IVR interfaces for automated customer access. PASS can also be fully integrated with Trapeze planning and scheduling software.

See also 
 Demand responsive transport
 Passenger information system
 Intermodal Journey Planner
 Intelligent transportation system

Notes

Software companies of Canada
Scheduling (transportation)